Sgt. Pepper Knew My Father is a 1988 multi-artist compilation LP/cassette of 1980s artists recording new versions of the songs on The Beatles album Sgt. Pepper's Lonely Hearts Club Band.  The album was produced by the New Musical Express to raise money for Childline, the charity founded by the BBC1 consumer programme That's Life!  It was also intended to celebrate the 21st anniversary of the original release of Sgt. Pepper's Lonely Hearts Club Band on 1 June 1967.  Apart from separate tracks on some artists' own re-releases/compilations, the only release it ever saw on compact disc was a promotional recording.

The title is a pun on the song "Lloyd George Knew My Father".

A single released to help promote the album, a double-A side of "With a Little Help from My Friends" by Wet Wet Wet and "She's Leaving Home" by Billy Bragg with Cara Tivey, reached number one on the UK Singles Chart.

Track listing
The track listing of the album was identical to that of the Beatles' original release, though the gibberish known as the "Sgt. Pepper Inner Groove" appears as part of Frank Sidebottom's appearance at the end of side one, as well at the end of side two (recorded by The Fall).

See also
 Ruby Trax - The NME's Roaring Forty - features the Top 10 version of "Suicide Is Painless" by Manic Street Preachers

References

The Beatles tribute albums
1988 compilation albums
Pop compilation albums
Rock compilation albums